Čehi 2 on Rombonski podi is the deepest sinkhole in Slovenia and the 13th deepest cave in the world. It is 1505 meters deep and 5536 meters long. There is a siphon at the bottom. The entrance is located 2033 meters above the sea level. The cave was discovered in 1991. The depth of the cave makes it very popular for Slovenian and foreign cave expeditions.

References 

Caves of Slovenia
Triglav National Park